Heald Island is an island,  long and  high, which projects through the ice of Koettlitz Glacier just east of Walcott Bay, in Victoria Land, Antarctica. It was discovered and named by the British National Antarctic Expedition (1901–04) for Seaman William L. Heald, a member of the expedition who saved the life of Hartley T. Ferrar when the latter was suffering from scurvy in 1902.

See also 
 List of antarctic and sub-antarctic islands

References

Islands of Victoria Land
Scott Coast